Khothakpa  is a village in Pemagatshel District in south-eastern Bhutan.

At the 2005 census, its population was 238.

References 

Populated places in Bhutan